Vaneq may refer to:
 Vaneq-e Olya
 Vaneq-e Sofla